Alex Jones (born 1974) is an American radio host, conspiracy theorist, filmmaker, and author.

Alex Jones may also refer to:

 Alex Jones (actor), American actor and advocate for the deaf
 Alex Jones (Australian hip-hop artist, member of the group Lgeez) 
 Alex Jones (baseball) (1869–1941), American Major League Baseball pitcher, 1889–1903
 Alex Jones (basketball) (born 1987), American basketball player
 Alex Jones (cricketer) (born 1988), Welsh cricketer
 Alex Jones (footballer, born 1964), English football defender active in the 1980s and 1990s
 Alex Jones (footballer, born 1994), English football forward
 Alex S. Jones (born 1946), American journalist
 Alex Jones (playwright), British actor, playwright and filmmaker
 Alex Jones (preacher) (1941–2017), African-American Roman Catholic deacon and preacher
 Alex Jones (racing driver) (1988–2019), Welsh racing driver
 Alex Jones (rugby league) (born 1993), Welsh rugby league player
 Alex Jones (Welsh presenter) (born 1977), Welsh television presenter

See also 
 Alexandra Jones (disambiguation)
 Alexander Jones (disambiguation)
 Alec Jones (1924–1983), British Labour Party politician
 Alex Johns (1966–2010), American film and television producer
 Jones (surname)